Nietrzeba  is a village in the administrative district of Gmina Józefów nad Wisłą, within Opole Lubelskie County, Lublin Voivodeship, in eastern Poland.

References

Nietrzeba